Lieutenant General Fazle Haq  (Pashto/ Urdu language: فضل حق;  (10 September 1928 – 3 October 1991)), was a high-ranking general in the Pakistan Army, and the former martial law administrator (MLA) of Khyber-Pakhtunkhwa province of Pakistan. He was the "Corps-Commander" of the XI Corps, and commanded all the Pakistan Army assets assigned in the Khyber-Pakhtunkhwa Province. He commanded the combatant brigades, and supervised the clandestine covert network during the Soviet–Afghan War. He was one of the leading generals who led the Pakistan Combatant Forces during the Soviet–Afghan War. As military administrator, he had set up a network of training of the Afghan mujahideen. Under his command, the elements of Pakistan's administrative XI Corps participated in numerous operations against the Soviet Union.

He served as a chief military administrator (governor) throughout the military dictatorial rule of General Muhammad Zia-ul-Haq from 1978 to 1985 and also served as the caretaker chief minister of the province in the latter half of 1988.

Army career
As an army officer, Fazle Haq was commissioned in the Guides Cavalry (Frontier Force) regiment of the Armoured Corps. He was instructor at Pakistan Military Academy in 1953–54 at the rank of captain. During the Indo-Pakistani War of 1965, then Major Fazle Haq was part of the Guides Cavalry in the 6th Armoured Division, when the regiment launched a two-squadron attack at Phillaurah on 11 September. The attack was targeted against the Indian 1st Armoured Division, and as a result both sides faced heavy casualties. This was presumed a Pakistani victory, as the fighting did not resume until 13 September, as the enemy was more cautious. However, it was a Pyrrhic victory.

As a lieutenant-colonel, Fazle Haq commanded his own regiment, the Guides Cavalry, during 1968 and 1969. Then by 1975, as a major general, he took over the 6th Armoured Division stationed at Kharian. Now promoted to lieutenant general, Haq was the commander of XI Corps at Peshawar from January 1978 to March 1980. By this time, General Zia-ul-Haq had imposed a martial law in the country, and Fazle Haq was concurrently appointed the Governor of Khyber-Pakhtunkhwa. After retirement from the army in 1980, he stayed on as the governor, finally relinquishing the charge in December 1985 when the martial law was lifted in the country. During his time as governor and corps commander, he was considered one of President Zia-ul Haq's closest confidantes and a key architect of the Afghan mujahidin groups. He was actively involved with Afghan mujahidin groups, including the Haqqani group and Gulbuddin Hekmatyar until the end of the Soviet-Afghan war and often met with high-ranking CIA and government officials, including Attorney General of the United States William F. Smith and other political key figures for funding and support for the Afghan terrorism. He remains well respected and well known among the people of Khyber-Pakhtunkhwa for services rendered during his tenure as governor.

Family and personal life
Fazle Haq was born on 10 September 1928, in Mardan (NWFP, British India), now Khyber Pakhtunkhwa, Pakistan, to an ethnic Pashtun family. Fazle Haq had two sisters and three brothers. His father, Pir Fazle Khaliq, served as a civil servant. His eldest brother was Major General Fazl-i- Raziq who was chairman of WAPDA and Pakistan ambassador to several countries. His other brothers were Pir Fazle Hussain and Pir Fazle Rehman.

Fazle Haq studied in Mardan up to Grade 3 and pursued his education up to class 8 in Kohat from 1935 to 1939. He then joined Prince of Wales Royal Indian Military College, Dehradun, for further education.

Political career
He was governor of the province from October 1978 to December 1985. He remained senator from March 1988 to December 1988, member of the National Assembly from November 1988 to August 1990. He also served as caretaker chief minister of the province from 31 May 1988 to 2 December 1988. He was also the provincial president of Pakistan Muslim League.

He contested and lost the 1988 general elections from his home town of Mardan; however, he won from Kohistan. In the next elections, he won from Malakand with an overwhelming majority and remained a member of the NWFP provincial assembly until his assassination in 1991. He also remained as caretaker chief minister of NWFP. On 3 October 1991, he was assassinated on his way home from the provincial assembly session by an unknown assailant. He was buried in Peshawar at the Cantonment Board graveyard on Warsak road.

Awards and decorations

References

External links
 NWFP Provincial government

Pakistani generals
Pakistan Armoured Corps officers
Governors of Khyber Pakhtunkhwa
Chief Ministers of Khyber Pakhtunkhwa
1928 births
Military government of Pakistan (1977–1988)
1991 deaths